Growing Up in Public may refer to:

 Growing Up in Public (Lou Reed album), 1980
 Growing Up in Public (Jimmy Nail album), 1992
 Growing Up in Public (Professor Green album), 2014